Pulicat Lake Bird Sanctuary is a sanctuary for birds, 759 km2 in area, located in the Tirupati district of Andhra Pradesh and a protected area of the Thiruvallur District of Tamil Nadu, India. Pulicat Lake is the second largest brackish-water eco-system in India after Chilka lake in Orissa. The sanctuary's international name is Pulicat Lake Wildlife Sanctuary (IBA Code: IN261, Criteria: A1, A4iii).

Geography
Central location is: . 327.33 km2 is managed by the Andhra Pradesh Forest Department and 153.67 km2 is managed by the Tamil Nadu Forest Department. 108 km2 is a National Park area. Rainfall ranges from 800–2000 mm. Temperature varies from 14°C to 33°C. Altitude ranges from 100’ above mean sea level to 1200’ above mean sea level.

Fauna
The sanctuary has many greater flamingos. It also attracts many migratory birds and also is a feeding and nesting ground for aquatic and terrestrial birds such as pelicans, storks, etc. The biodiversity of this lake attracts hundreds of thousands of visitors per year.

Threats
Pulicat Lake may disappear within 100 years by being filled up with silt. Efforts by government and private non-governmental organizations are working to halt lake destruction. The Art & Architecture Research, Development and Education (AARDE) Foundation does regular activities at Pazhaverkadu to create awareness on the vanishing lagoon.

See also
 Bird sanctuaries of India
 Vedanthangal Bird Sanctuary
 Guindy National Park

References

Bird sanctuaries of Andhra Pradesh
Bird sanctuaries of Tamil Nadu
Coromandel Coast
Nellore district
Tiruvallur district
Protected areas with year of establishment missing